Ricardo Gomes de Mendonça is a Brazilian paralympic athlete. He competed at the 2020 Summer Paralympics in the athletics competition, winning the bronze medal in the Men's 200 metres T37.

References 

Living people
Place of birth missing (living people)
Year of birth missing (living people)
Brazilian male sprinters
Athletes (track and field) at the 2020 Summer Paralympics
Medalists at the 2020 Summer Paralympics
Paralympic medalists in athletics (track and field)
Paralympic athletes of Brazil
Paralympic bronze medalists for Brazil
21st-century Brazilian people